The final of the Women's Shot Put event at the 2003 Pan American Games took place on Thursday August 7, 2003. Cuba's winner, Yumileidi Cumbá, was the only woman to cross the 19-metres barrier.

Medalists

Records

Results

See also
 2003 Shot Put Year Ranking
2003 World Championships in Athletics – Women's shot put
Athletics at the 2004 Summer Olympics – Women's shot put

Notes

References
Results

Shot Put, Women
2003
2003 in women's athletics